Tramitichromis trilineatus is a species of cichlid endemic to Lake Malawi where it occurs in the southeastern portion of the lake, preferring shallow waters with sandy substrates.  It can reach a length of  TL.  It can also be found in the aquarium trade.

References

trilineatus
Fish of Malawi
Fish of Lake Malawi
Fish described in 1931
Taxa named by Ethelwynn Trewavas
Taxonomy articles created by Polbot